In enzymology, an oligopeptide-transporting ATPase is an enzyme that catalyzes the chemical reaction

ATP + H2O + oligopeptide(out)  ADP + phosphate + oligopeptide(in)

The 3 substrates of this enzyme are ATP, H2O, and oligopeptide, whereas its 3 products are ADP, phosphate, and oligopeptide.

This enzyme belongs to the family of hydrolases, specifically those acting on acid anhydrides to catalyse transmembrane movement of substances. The systematic name of this enzyme class is ATP phosphohydrolase (oligopeptide-importing). This enzyme is also called oligopeptide permease.

References

 
 
 
 

EC 3.6.3
Enzymes of unknown structure